Eudonia meliturga is a moth in the family Crambidae. It was described by Edward Meyrick in 1905. This species is endemic to New Zealand.

The wingspan is 17–19 mm. The forewings are ochreous-whitish, suffused with pale ochreous-yellowish in the disc and sprinkled with dark fuscous. The first line is ochreous-white, edged posteriorly with dark fuscous suffusion. The second line is ochreous-white, edged anteriorly with dark fuscous. The terminal area is irrorated with dark fuscous and there is an ochreous-whitish subterminal line, as well as an interrupted ochreous-white terminal line. The hindwings are pale whitish-grey, suffused with grey posteriorly. Adults have been recorded on wing in December and January.

References

Moths described in 1905
Eudonia
Moths of New Zealand
Endemic fauna of New Zealand
Taxa named by Edward Meyrick
Endemic moths of New Zealand